is a television series, produced in Japan, based on the Ring movie series. There are a total of 12 episodes in the series and a sequel was made called Rasen, consisting of 13 episodes.

Production
After the success of the film adaptation of Ring, the television series takes liberties to change the story. For example, at the end of the first episode, Asakawa has arrived at a cabin in Japan's countryside, to find a tape that had previously doomed three other people. On placing the tape into the video player, he is greeted unexpectedly with a music video by pop idol Nao Matsuzaki.

The series was first shown on January 7, 1999 on Fuji TV
and ended March 25. It was followed by a sequel TV series titled Spiral, which ran for 13 50-minute episodes. It features Akiko Yada and Tae Kimura reprising their roles, respectively.

Cast
 Toshirō Yanagiba as Kazuyuki Asakawa
 Tomoya Nagase as Ryûji Takayama
 Kotomi Kyono as Akiko Yoshino
 Akiko Yada as Mai Takano
 Tae Kimura as Sadako Yamamura
 Yūta Fukagawa as Yôichi Asakawa
 Hitomi Kuroki as Rieko Miyashita

List of episodes
"The Seal is Now Solved" - January 7th, 1999
"Killed by a Videotape" - January 14th, 1999
"Someone is Watching..." - January 21st, 1999
"A Virus of Silence" - January 28th, 1999
"The Dead Person Who Was Reborn" - February 4th, 1999
"A New Person with Supernatural Power" - February 11th, 1999
"Sadako Will Appear Tonight" - February 18th, 1999
"Someone Will Die When the Curse is Solved" - February 25th, 1999
"Planned Memory" - March 3rd, 1999
"Sadako's Revival" - March 11th, 1999
"Ryuji Takayama Dies" - March 18th, 1999
"The Curse Was Not Lifted. The Thirteenth Day, a New Dead Person Destroys the World" - March 25th, 1999

References

Works cited

External links
 Ring: The Final Chapter review
 
 

The Ring (franchise)
Japanese drama television series
Japanese horror fiction television series
1999 Japanese television series debuts
1999 Japanese television series endings
Television shows based on Japanese novels
Fuji TV dramas